Carole Watterson Troxler (née Carole Watterson) is an American historian, educator, and author. She is a Professor Emerita at Elon University.

Life
Carole Watterson Troxler was born in LaGrange, Georgia. Troxler received an A.B. degree from the University of Georgia, followed by a doctorate in history from the University of North Carolina at Chapel Hill. 

She was married to George Wesley Troxler (1942–2019) who also worked as a history professor at Elon.

Troxler has written about the Regulator Movement during the American Revolution, Alamance County, Sallie Stockard, Wyatt Outlaw, and Loyalists who fled the lower South for British East Florida after the American Revolution. Susan Schramm-Pate wrote that her book on Sallie Stockyard is a "masterfully crafted biography."

As an assistant professor of history at Elon in 1977, Troxler was invited to present a paper at the University of Edinburgh during a joint program sponsored by university's School of Scottish Studies and its history department. The previous year, Troxler authored a bicentennial history pamphlet for the North Carolina Department of Cultural Resources. In March 1988, Troxler was promoted to full professor with Elon College's history department.

Writings
 
Shuttle & Plow: A history of Alamance County, North Carolina, co-authored with William M. Vincent 
Farming Dissenters: The Regulator Movement in Piedmont North Carolina (2011)
Red Dog: A Tale of the Carolina Frontier (2017), a novel

Articles
"The Migration of Carolina and Georgia Loyalists to Nova Scotia and New Brunswick", Ph.D. dissertation, University of North Carolina at Chapel Hill (1974)
"Refuge, Resistance, and Reward: The Southern Loyalists' Claim on East Florida, The Journal of Southern History, Volume LV Number 4, November 1989
Article about Wyatt Outlaw, North Carolina Historical Review (October 2000)
"William Stephens and the "Georgia Malcontents": Conciliation, Conflict, and Capitulation", The Georgia Historical Quarterly, 1983

References

Year of birth missing (living people)
Living people
People from LaGrange, Georgia
American women historians
Elon University faculty
American women academics
American historians